107.1 FM is a radio station broadcasting from Edgar, Nebraska. The station serves the rural farm communities of Clay, Nuckolls and Thayer counties. The station is also known as The Cool Mix 107.1. KCGW-LP 107.1 FM is under the ownership of Williams Life Radio of Edgar, Nebraska and operates as a not for profit organization. The station features a mix of genres and syndicate programming. Bringing community events and local news to the radio. The station has a variety of in studio musical guests. 

KCGW-LP studio is located in Edgar, Nebraska.

References

http://licensing.fcc.gov/cgi-bin/ws.exe/prod/cdbs/pubacc/prod/sta_det.pl?Facility_id=193292
https://web.archive.org/web/20150108115425/http://williamsliferadio.com/
http://kcgwfm.com/
http://licensing.fcc.gov/cgi-bin/ws.exe/prod/cdbs/pubacc/prod/sta_det.pl?Facility_id=195864
http://licensing.fcc.gov/cgi-bin/ws.exe/prod/cdbs/pubacc/prod/sta_det.pl?Facility_id=194111

External links
 

CGW-LP
Radio stations established in 2014
2014 establishments in Nebraska
CGW-LP